This is a list of notable poets with Wikipedia pages, who were born or raised in Ireland or hold Irish citizenship.

Abbreviations for the languages of their writings: E: English; F: French; I: Irish; L: Latin; R: Russian

A–D

 Adomnán (d. 704, L)
 Æ (George William Russell) (1867–1935, E)
 William Allingham (1824–1889, E)
 Ivy Bannister (born 1951, E)
 Leland Bardwell (1922–2016, E)
 Beccán mac Luigdech (fl. c. 650, I)
 Samuel Beckett (1906–1989, E/F)
 Brendan Behan (1923–1964, E)
 Gerard Beirne (born 1962, E)
 Thomas Bibby (1799–1863, E)
 Blathmac mac Cú Brettan (fl. c. 750, I)
 Eavan Boland (born 1944, E)
 Dermot Bolger (born 1959, E)
 Pat Boran (born 1963, E)
 Samuel Boyse (1709–1749, E)
 Rory Brennan (born 1945, E)
 Frances Browne (1816–1887, E)
 George Brun (fl. late 18th century, I)
 Colette Bryce (born 1970, E)
 Catherine Byron (born 1947), E
 Michael Feeney Callan (born 1955, E)
 Moya Cannon (born 1956, E)
 Ciarán Carson (born 1948, E)
 James Casey  (1824–1909, E)
 Oengus Celi De (fl. c. 800, I)
 Patrick Chapman (born 1968, E)
 Austin Clarke (1896–1974, E)
 Brendan Cleary (born 1958, E)
 Brian Coffey (1905–1995, E)
 Colman ua Clasaigh (d. 661, I)
 Colmán mac Lénéni (d. 604, I)
 Padraic Colum (1881–1972, E)
 Susan Connolly (born 1956, E)
 Cúán úa Lothcháin (d. 1024)
 Cuirithir of Connacht (fl. 7th century, I)
 Catherine Ann Cullen, E
 John Cunningham (1729–1773, E)
 Tony Curtis (born 1955, E)
 Guaire Dall (fl. 849, I)
 Pádraig J. Daly (born 1943, E)
 Thomas Davis (1814–1845, E)
 Michael Davitt (1950–2005, I)
 Cecil Day-Lewis (1904–1972, E)
 Patrick Deeley (born 1953, E)
 Celia de Fréine (born 1948, I/E)
 Greg Delanty (born 1958, E)
 Kate Dempsey (poet) (born 1958, E)
 Louis de Paor (born 1961, I)
 Denis Devlin (1908–1959, E)
 John Dillon (1816–1866, E)
 Theo Dorgan (born 1953, E)
 Gerard Donovan (born 1959, E)
 Ellen Mary Patrick Downing (1828–1869, E)
 John Swanwick Drennan (1809–1893, E)
 William Drennan (1754–1820, E)
 Charles Gavan Duffy (1816–1903, E)
 Seán Dunne (1956–1995, E)
 Lord Dunsany (1878–1957, E)
 Paul Durcan (born 1944, E)

E–L

 John Ennis (born 1944, E)
 Martina Evans (born 1961, E)
 Elaine Feeney (born 1979, E)
 Piaras Feiritéar (c. 1600–1653, I)
 Fothadh an Fili (fl. 879, I)
 Flann Mainistrech (d. 1056, I)
 Patrick Galvin (1927–2011, E)
 Monk Gibbon (1896–1987, E)
 Oliver St. John Gogarty (1878–1957, E)
 Oliver Goldsmith (c. 1730–1774, E)
 Mark Granier (born 1957, E)
 Patrick Greaney (fl. 18th c., I)
 Gerald Griffin (1803–1840, E)
 Sarah Maria Griffin (c. 1988, E)
 Vona Groarke (born 1964, E)
 Stephen Gwynn (1864–1950, E)
 Kerry Hardie (born 1951, E)
 Anne Le Marquand Hartigan (born 1938, E)
 Michael Hartnett (1944–1999, I/E)
 Randolph Healy (born 1956, E)
 Séamus Heaney (1939–2013, E)
 F. R. Higgins (1896–1941, E)
 Kevin Higgins (born 1967, E)
 Rita Ann Higgins (born 1955, E)
 Pearse Hutchinson (1927–2012, I/E)
 Douglas Hyde (1860–1949, I/E)
 Pat Ingoldsby (born 1942, E)
 Valentin Iremonger (1918–1991, E)
 John Jordan (1930–1988, E)
 James Joyce (1882–1941, E)
 Trevor Joyce (born 1947, E)
 Patrick Kavanagh (1904–1967, E)
 Rita Kelly (born 1953, I)
 Charles Kickham (1828–1882, E)
 Thomas Kinsella (born 1928, E)
 Anatoly Kudryavitsky (born 1954, R/E)
 Emily Lawless (1845–1913, E)
 Sarah Leech (1809–1820, E)
 Francis Ledwidge (1887–1917, E)
 C. S. Lewis (1899–1963, E)
 James Liddy (1934–2008, E)
 Eddie Linden (born 1935, E)
 Loisin an Fili (fl. 868, I)
 Michael Longley (born 1939, E)
 Luccreth moccu Chiara (fl. c. 600, I)

M–P

 Aimirgein mac Amalgado (I)
 Anluan Mac Aodhagáin (I)
 Seán Mac Aoidh (fl. 1820)
 Micheál Mac Suibhne (c. 1760–1820, I)
 Denis Florence MacCarthy (1817–1868, E)
 Flannagan mac Ceallach (fl. 879, I)
 Dónal Meirgeach Mac Conmara (18th century)
 Cináedh mac Coscrach (d. 874, I)
 Donagh MacDonagh (1912–1968, E)
 Thomas MacDonagh (1878–1916, E)
 Patrick MacDonogh (1902–1961, E)
 Athairne Mac Eoghain (I)
 Seán MacFalls (born 1957, E)
 Patrick MacGill (1889–1960, E)
 Thomas MacGreevy (1893–1967, E)
 John Macken (c. 1784–1823, E)
 Louis MacNeice (1907–1963, E)
 Tomás Mac Síomóin (born 1938, I)
 Marie MacSweeney, (living, E)
 Neil McBride (1861–1942, I)
 Hugh McFadden (born 1942, E)
 Medbh McGuckian (born 1950, E)
 Nigel McLoughlin (born 1968, E)
 Bernard McNulty (1842–1892, E)
 Máire Mhac an tSaoi (born 1922, I)
 Maenghal the Pilgrim (fl. 844, I)
 Derek Mahon (1941–2020, E)
 James Clarence Mangan (1803–1849, E)
 Caitlín Maude (1941–1982, I)
 Máighréad Medbh (born 1959, E)
  John Mee (born 1965, E)
 Paula Meehan (born 1955, E)
 Brian Merriman (1747–1805, I)
 Alice Milligan (1865–1953, E)
 Dorothy Molloy (1942–2004, E)
 John Montague (1929–2016, E)
 Thomas Moore (1779–1852, E)
 Paul Muldoon (born 1951, E)
 Hayden Murphy (born 1945, E)
 Christine Murray, 21st century
 Kate Newmann (born 1965, E)
 Eibhlín Dubh Ní Chonaill (c. 1743 – c. 1800, I)
 Nuala Ní Chonchúir (born 1970, E)
 Eiléan Ní Chuilleanáin (born 1942, E)
 Nuala Ní Dhomhnaill (born 1952, I)
 Ciara Ní É (E,I)
 Ailbhe Ní Ghearbhuigh (born 1984, I) 
 Áine Ní Ghlinn (born 1955, I)
 Doireann Ní Ghríofa (born 1981, I/E)
 Charlotte Nooth (19th century, I)
 Dáibhí Ó Bruadair (David O Bruadair) (1625–1698, I)
 Máirtín Ó Direáin (1910–1988, I)
 John Francis O'Donnell (1837–1874, E)
 Mary O'Donnell (born 1954, E)
 Bernard O'Donoghue (born 1945, E)
 Gregory O'Donoghue (1951–2005, E)
 Dennis O'Driscoll (1954–2012, E)
 Pádraig Ó hÉigeartaigh (1871–1936, I)
 Cinaed Ó hArtucain (d. 975, I)
 John O'Higgin (d. 1490, I)
 Nessa O'Mahony (living, E)
 Ó Maoilciaran an Fili (fl. c. 1395, I)
 Henrietta O'Neill (1758–1793, E)
 Liam Ó Muirthile (1950-2018)
 Seán na Ráithíneach Ó Murchadha (1700-1762, I)
 Mary Devenport O'Neill (1879–1967, E)
 Antoine Ó Raifteiri (Anthony Raftery) (1784–1835, I)
 Aogán Ó Rathaille (1675–1729, I)
 Seán Ó Ríordáin (1916–1977, I)
 Cathal Ó Searcaigh (born 1956, I)
 Micheal O'Siadhail (born 1947, I/E)
 Eoghan Rua Ó Súilleabháin/Owen Roe O'Sullivan (1748–1782, I)
 Seumas O'Sullivan (1879–1958, E)
 Eoghan Ó Tuairisc (Eugene Watters) (1919–1982, I/E)
 Frank Ormsby (born 1947, E)
 Tom Paulin (born 1949, E)
 Patrick Pearse (Pádraig Anraí Mac Piarais) (1879–1916, I/E)
 Joseph Plunkett (1887–1916, E)

Q–Z

 George Reavey (1907–1976, E)
 Nell Regan (born 1969, E)
 Maurice Riordan (born 1953, E)
 Lennox Robinson (1886–1958, E)
 Gabriel Rosenstock (born 1949, I/E)
 Rosemarie Rowley (born 1942, E)
 Adam Rudden (born 1983, E)
 Blanaid Salkeld (1880–1959, E)
 Maurice Scully (born 1952, E)
 John W. Sexton (born 1958, E)
 Eileen Shanahan (1901–1979, E)
 James Simmons (1933–2001, E)
 Peter Sirr (born 1960, E)
 Michael Smith (born 1942, E)
 Cherry Smyth (born 1960, E) 
 Geoffrey Squires (born 1942, E)
 James Stephens (1880–1950, E)
 Eithne Strong (1925–1999, I/E)
 Matthew Sweeney (1952–2018, E)
 Jonathan Swift (1667–1745, E)
 John Millington Synge (1871–1909, E)
 Senchán Torpéist (fl. c. 580 – c. 650, I)
 Eliza Dorothea Cobbe, Lady Tuite (c. 1764–1850, E)
 Katharine Tynan (1861–1931, E)
 Muiredhach na Tengadh Ua Sléibhín (d.1022) I
 Catherine Walsh (born 1964, E)
 David Wheatley (born 1970, E)
 Jane Wilde (1821–1896, E)
 Oscar Wilde (1854–1900, E)
 Richard D'Alton Williams (1822–1862, E)
 James Wills (1790–1868, E)
 Florence Mary Wilson, (1870–1946, E)
 Sheila Wingfield (1906–1992, E)
 Macdara Woods (1942–2008, E)
 Joseph Woods (born 1966, E)
 W. B. Yeats (1865–1939, E)
 Augustus Young (born 1943, E)

See also

 Irish poetry
 Irish literature
 List of Irish dramatists
 List of Irish historians
 List of Irish novelists
 List of Irish short story writers
 List of Scottish poets, including those in Gaelic.

References

External links
 

 
Poets
Irish